The term ground failure is a general reference to landslides, liquefaction, lateral spreads, and any other consequence of shaking that affects the stability of the ground.

Overview 
In geology, it means an effect of seismic activity, such as an earthquake, where the ground becomes very soft, due to the shaking, and acts like a liquid, causing landslides, spreading, and settling. Earthquake-triggered landslides and liquefaction, collectively referred to as ground failure, can be a significant contributor to earthquake losses. The USGS Ground Failure (GF) earthquake product provides near-real-time spatial estimates of earthquake-triggered landslide and liquefaction hazard following significant earthquakes worldwide.

References

External links 

 Ground failure - USGS
 Ground failure (Earthquake Glossary) - USGS
Earthquakes